Uniform Investment Adviser Law Examination, also called the Series 65 exam, is a test taken by individuals in the United States who seek to become licensed investment adviser representatives. The exam covers topics necessary to provide investment advice to clients.

The Uniform Investment Adviser Law Examination was developed by the North American Securities Administrators Association (NASAA) and is administered by the Financial Industry Regulatory Authority (FINRA). Each Series 65, Uniform Investment Adviser Law Examination, contains a total of 140 questions. One hundred thirty (130) of the questions count toward whether the candidate passes or fails the Series 65 exam. The other 10 questions are pretest and could appear in any position within the exam but do not count towards the final grade. To pass the Series 65 Exam, candidates must correctly answer at least 94 of the 130 scored questions. Applicants have 180 minutes to complete the exam.

The Uniform Investment Adviser Law Examinations are assembled by FINRA using a process called "on the fly." Each question in the pool has two parameters that are used as part of the assembly, a difficulty parameter and a content parameter. Each exam is assembled to meet the exam specifications for content and to have the same difficulty level as all other exams in the same Series.

Examination
The Uniform Investment Adviser Law Examination consists of 130 questions plus 10 pretest questions that cover topics applicants must know to provide investment advice to clients. Applicants have 180 minutes to complete the examination, and must answer at least 94 (72%) of the questions correctly to pass the Series 65 exam.

The examination is a closed book test. On completion of the examination, the score for each section and the overall test score are immediately available to the candidate.
Prior to January 1, 2010, a score of 68.5% was required to pass.

Registration
Individuals providing investment advice are called "Investment Adviser Representatives" (IAR). These IARs must generally complete The Uniform Investment Adviser Law Examination (see List of securities examinations) known as the Series 65 Exam, or by meeting the exam waiver requirement by holding one or more of the following pre-qualifying designations: Certified Financial Planner (CFP), Chartered Financial Consultant (ChFC); Personal Financial Specialist (PFS), Chartered Financial Analyst (CFA), or Chartered Investment Counselor (CIC).

History 
Since August 2020, when the SEC broadened the definition of accredited investor, the Series 65 exam is the only qualifying exam that doesn't require the sponsorship of a firm.

See also
 List of securities examinations
 Series 7 exam
 Series 24 exam
 Series 63 exam
 Financial Industry Regulatory Authority (FINRA)

Notes

Financial regulation
United States securities law